RAF Tangmere was a Royal Air Force station located in Tangmere, England, famous for its role in the Battle of Britain. 

It was one of several stations near Chichester, West Sussex. The famous Second World War aces Wing Commander Douglas Bader, and the then inexperienced Johnnie Johnson were stationed at Tangmere in 1941.

History

First World War
The aerodrome was founded in 1917 for use by the Royal Flying Corps as a training base. In 1918 it was turned over to the Aviation Section, U.S. Signal Corps (USSC) as a training ground, and continued as such until the end of the Great War in November of that year, after which the airfield was mothballed.

Inter-War Years
In 1925 the station re-opened to serve the RAF's Fleet Air Arm, and went operational in 1926 with No. 43 Squadron equipped with biplane Gloster Gamecocks (there is a row of houses located near the museum entrance called Gamecock Terrace).

As war threatened in the late 1930s, the fighter aircraft based at Tangmere became faster, with Hawker Furies, Gloster Gladiators, and Hawker Hurricanes all being used.

In 1934, Squadron Leader C W Hill, famous WW1 prisoner-of-war escaper, commanded No. 1 Fighter Squadron at RAF Tangmere. Two years later, as a Wing Commander, he became the station commander.

Second World War
In 1939 the airfield was enlarged to defend the south coast against attack by the Luftwaffe, with Tangmere's only hotel and some houses being demolished in the process. The RAF commandeered the majority of houses in the centre of the village, with only six to eight families being allowed to stay. The village would not resume its status as a civilian community until 1966.

In August 1940 the first squadron (No. 602 Squadron RAF) of Supermarine Spitfires was based at the satellite airfield at nearby Westhampnett, as the Battle of Britain began. By now the villagers had mainly been evacuated, and extensive ranges of RAF buildings had sprung up.

The first, and worst, enemy raid on the station came on 16 August 1940 when hundreds of Junkers Ju 87 (Stuka) dive bombers and fighters crossed the English coast and attacked Tangmere. There was extensive damage to buildings and aircraft on the ground and 14 ground staff and six civilians were killed. However the station was kept in service and brought back into full operation.

Throughout the war, the station was used by the Royal Air Force Special Duty Service when 161 (Special Duty) Squadron's Lysander flight came down to do their insertion and pick-up operations into occupied Europe. The SOE used Tangmere Cottage, opposite the main entrance to the base to house and receive their agents. Today the cottage sports a commemorative plaque to its former secret life.

Later in the war, as the RAF turned from defence to attack, Group Captain Douglas Bader, the legless fighter ace, commanded the Tangmere wing of Fighter Command. Today he is commemorated by a plaque outside the former Bader Arms public house, now a Co-operative Food outlet in the village. 616 Squadron, which included Johnnie Johnson and Hugh Dundas, arrived at Tangmere in late February 1941. Johnson went on to become the highest scoring Western Allied fighter ace against the Luftwaffe.

Many of those killed at the base, from both sides in conflict, are buried in the cemetery at St Andrews Church, Tangmere, today tended by the Commonwealth War Graves Commission. American RAF pilot Billy Fiske who died at Tangmere in 1940 was one of the first American aviators to die during the Second World War.

Postwar
After the war, the RAF High Speed Flight was based at Tangmere as part of Central Fighter Establishment. In September 1946, a world air speed record of 616 mph (991 km/h) was set by Group Captain Edward "Teddy" Mortlock Donaldson in a Gloster Meteor; after his death in 1992, he was buried in St Andrews Church. In September 1953, Squadron Leader Neville Duke became holder of the world air speed record when he flew a Hawker Hunter at 727 mph (1,170 km/h) – the 50th anniversary of this event was commemorated in 2003.  No 38 Group Tactical Communications Wing RAF and 244 Signal Squadron (Air Support) were the last units to leave the base, relocating to RAF Benson.

On 1 June 1950, a Gloster Meteor flying eastwards over Portsmouth reported a UFO at 20,000 ft. It is also seen by the radar at RAF Wartling, and was described as Britain's first flying saucer, and led to the Flying Saucer Working Party later that year.

In the late 1950s the flying was restricted to ground radar calibration and the Joint Services Language School moved there. In 1960 the station was granted the "freedom of the City of Chichester" and the event was marked by a march through the town and service in the Cathedral.

Some of the last flying units to be based at the station included:
No. 245 Squadron RAF (25 August 1958 – 19 April 1963) (Canberra B.2, disbanded by renumbering to No. 98 Squadron, 19 April 1963). 
No. 98 Squadron RAF (19 April - 1 October 1963) (moved to RAF Watton)
No. 115 Squadron RAF (25 August 1958 – 1 October 1963)
'B' Flt, No. 22 Squadron RAF (June 1961 - May 1964)

In 1963-64 the last flying units left. However the station continued to be used for several years and, in 1968, Prince Charles took his first flying lesson at Tangmere. The station finally closed on 16 October 1970; a single Spitfire flew over the airfield as the RAF ensign was lowered for the last time.

Units

The following units were also here at some point:

Units

Present use 
Following the closure of the RAF station, some of the land around the runways was returned to farming. Tangmere Airfield Nurseries have built large glasshouses for the cultivation of peppers and aubergines.

Until 1983  of barracks, admin blocks and repair workshops remained derelict until bought by Seawards Properties Ltd. Housing soon spread around the airfield, and most RAF buildings were demolished.  Officers' quarters have been retained as homes and two original RAF buildings remain, the grade II listed Control Tower, and one of the 'H Block' accommodation buildings.

The majority of the airfield is now farmed, and since 1979 the runways have slowly been removed thus returning the whole airfield back to large scale farming once again. In 2016 the final piece of apron and the three T.2 hangars were removed, with houses built in their place on a street called Hangar Drive.

The derelict control tower forms part of the farm but is now bricked up and partly overgrown. It became a grade II listed building as of 2011 and was placed on the heritage at risk register in 2015. A campaign is currently underway to restore the control tower which has received local and national press coverage. This is being led by Tangmere Tower Community Interest Company, who restaged 'The Eisenhower Dinner' at the Chichester Harbour Hotel in 2019 to mark the 75th anniversary of General Eisenhower's original meal in 1944. The CIC are working with the local Aviation  Museum, the University of Chichester and Sussex Police and with their architect have submitted a planning application for phase one of the project.

Tangmere Military Aviation Museum

Tangmere Military Aviation Museum was founded by a group of enthusiastic veterans. It has a replica Supermarine Spitfire and Hawker Hurricane as well as many original aircraft, including Neville Duke's speed record Hawker Hunter. On display is the 'Star' Meteor flown by Teddy Donaldson when he set the World Air Speed Record in September 1946, breaking the 1,000 km/h barrier.

34067 locomotive
A number of Oliver Bulleid's light pacific locomotives were named after Battle of Britain squadrons, stations, or commanders.  One such locomotive that is preserved and still in main line operation is named "Tangmere" (no 34067).

See also
 List of Battle of Britain airfields
 List of Battle of Britain squadrons

References

External links

Tangmere Military Aviation Museum

Royal Air Force stations in West Sussex
Battle of Britain
Military installations closed in 1970
Royal Air Force stations of World War II in the United Kingdom